September Mornings is a Brazilian television drama series created by Luís Pinheiro, starring singer Liniker as Cassandra.  The series premiered on Amazon Prime Video on June 25, 2021.  The second season premiered on September September 23, 2022.

Synopsis 
September Mornings tells the story of Cassandra (Liniker), a transgender woman working as a delivery driver for a mobile app.  Currently living in São Paulo, she had to leave her hometown to pursue her dream of being a cover singer for Vanusa, a Brazilian singer from the 1970s.  After struggling for many years, she has finally found her own apartment and is in love with Ivaldo (Thomás Aquino).  Things get complicated when an ex-girlfriend, Leide (Karine Teles), re-enters her life with a boy who claims to be her son.

Cast and Characters

Main Characters 
 Liniker as Cassandra
 Thomás Aquino as Ivaldo, Cassandra's lover
 Karine Teles as Leide, Cassandra's ex-girlfriend
 Gustavo Coelho as Gersinho, Leide's son
 Paulo Miklos as Décio
 Isabela Ordoñez as Grazy
 Clodd Dias as Roberta
 Gero Camilo as Aristides

Recurring 
 Elisa Lucinda as Vanusa (voice-over)
 Linn da Quebrada as Pedrita
 Dante Aganju as Bernardo
 Chelfa Caxino as Jana
 Silmara Deon as School Principal
 Inara dos Santos as Ivana
 Clébia Sousa as Irene

Episodes

First Season (2021)

References

External links
 

2020s Brazilian television series
2021 Brazilian television series debuts
Brazilian drama television series
Brazilian LGBT-related television shows
Portuguese-language television shows
Poverty in fiction
Transgender-related television shows
2020s LGBT-related drama television series
Television shows set in São Paulo
Television shows filmed in São Paulo (state)
Television series by Amazon Studios
Amazon Prime Video original programming